Chesty XIII (born about 2007) was the mascot of the United States Marine Corps from 2008 to 2013. A male English Bulldog, he was named after Chesty Puller. James N. Mattis once described Chesty XIII as "a kindred soul", however, the dog was also disruptive on at least one occasion when he snarled and barked at Bravo, United States Secretary of Defense Leon Panetta's Golden Retriever.

See also
 Jiggs II
 List of individual dogs

References

|-

|-

United States Marine Corps lore and symbols
Military animals
Individual dogs in the United States
American mascots